Thu Tran is a writer and producer, known for Food Party (2009). She is the star of the Independent Film Channel television show Food Party and MTVother web series Late Night Munchies.
She is of Vietnamese descent and was raised in Cleveland, Ohio. She now lives in Brooklyn. She crafts many of the puppets herself. She is also a cook. Thu first learned to cook from her parents and then attended the Cleveland Institute for Art. She then moved to New York and created food-themed art installations.

Thu was named on Splashlife's list of 30 Under 30: Futuristic Foodies.

References

American television actresses
American television writers
American writers of Vietnamese descent
Living people
Malaysian emigrants to the United States
Actresses of Vietnamese descent
Year of birth missing (living people)
American women television writers
21st-century American women